The Schifffahrtsgesellschaft des Vierwaldstättersees or Lake Lucerne Navigation Company (commonly abbreviated to SGV) is a public Swiss company operating passenger ships and boats on Lake Lucerne. The company is based in the city of Lucerne, and its origins can be traced back to 1836. Today it is the largest inland shipping company in Switzerland, and is notable for operating a number of historic paddle steamers, in addition to more modern motor vessels.

The company provides public transport routes to 32 places along the shore of the lake, with interchange to both main line and mountain railways at various points. Whilst much usage of these services is tourist or leisure oriented, the company also continues to provide practical public transport links between the smaller lakeside communities.

The company also owns its own shipyard, Shiptec Lucerne, which undertakes new build and rebuild work both for the SGV and for other shipping companies.

History 

Lake Lucerne has formed an important part of Switzerland's transport system for many centuries, and at least since the opening of the first track across the Gotthard Pass in 1230. This trade grew with the opening of a new mail coach road across the pass in 1830. This road had its northern terminus at Flüelen at the extreme eastern end of the lake, and the lake provided the only practical onward link to the cities of northern Switzerland.

In 1835, Casimir Friedrich Knörr decided to take advantage of the growing trade on Lake Lucerne by forming a steamship company and building a paddle steamer, the Stadt Luzern of 1837. His service began operating in 1837, although political pressure by the watermens guilds prevented it operating into the canton of Uri, and hence to Flüelen, for the first year of its operation.

Once this vessel showed the way, various other steamship companies were established. Eventually this led to price cutting, and several steamboat companies failed, or were merged into their rivals. In 1870, the two oldest and largest companies merged to form the Vereinigten Dampfschiffgesellschaft des Vierwaldstättersees (United Steamboat Company of Lake Lucerne). In 1885, this was renamed the Dampfschiffgesellschaft des Vierwaldstättersees (Steamship Company of Lake Lucerne; DGV), and in 1960 it became the SGV.

Fleet 
A fleet of 21 passenger ships, including five historical paddle steamers and 16 motor vessels of various ages and sizes is operated by the Schifffahrtsgesellschaft des Vierwaldstättersees. SGV's flagship is the paddle steamer Stadt Luzern.

Routes 

The SGV operates several routes, with many variants, on Lake Lucerne. The following places are served, listed here in clockwise order around the lake shore from Lucerne:

Not all services serve all stops, nor are they necessarily served in the order presented above.

The SGV operates both historic paddle steamers and more modern motor vessels on its scheduled services. Whilst either kind of ship may operate an individual service, the company publishes in advance those services for which it is planning to use paddle steamers.

The SGV services are well integrated with other public transport and tourist services. The landing stages at Lucerne and Flüelen provide 'cross-quay' interchange with the main line railways at Lucerne station and Flüelen station respectively.

The interchange at Flüelen forms a key part of the Gotthard Panorama Express, a tourist oriented combined paddle steamer and rail service that connects Lucerne and Lugano. The SGV provides the link from Lucerne to Flüelen, connecting there with a Swiss Federal Railways train to Lugano.

See also 
The Beckenried–Gersau car ferry

References

External links 
 
 Web site of the Schifffahrtsgesellschaft des Vierwaldstättersees

Lake Lucerne
Paddle steamers
Shipping companies of Switzerland
Transport in Nidwalden
Transport in Obwalden
Transport in the canton of Lucerne
Transport in the canton of Schwyz
Transport in the canton of Uri
Companies based in Lucerne